The flagship radio stations of the professional American football team, the Baltimore Ravens, are Hearst-owned WIYY (98 Rock) and WBAL 1090 AM, with Gerry Sandusky (WBAL-TV Sports Anchor since 1988) as the play-by-play announcer and Rod Woodson (Baltimore Ravens CB-S 1998–2001) as the color commentator. Sandusky has been the primary voice since the ballclub changed flagship stations after the 2005 campaign. Long-time WMAR-TV sports director and anchor Scott Garceau and Tom Matte had previously formed the nucleus of the broadcast team for the franchise's first ten seasons.

The team's flagship station is WIYY/WBAL sister station WBAL-TV, which broadcasts NFL preseason games and team programming throughout the season. The programming is syndicated to WJLA-TV in Washington, WGAL in the Harrisburg–Lebanon–York–Lancaster, Pennsylvania market, and until 2017, was carried through the remainder of the team's region by CSN Mid-Atlantic. In January 2017, the Ravens announced that it had cut ties with CSN Mid-Atlantic, as the network was cutting back on its day-to-day coverage of other teams in the region in order to focus more extensively on the Washington Capitals and Wizards—whose games are broadcast by CSN Mid-Atlantic, and whose owner holds a stake in the network. The team announced that it would seek a new partner; until 2010, these rights were held by MASN.

The Ravens' regular season games are typically broadcast by WJZ-TV as part of CBS's rights to the AFC, but games may occasionally be broadcast on WBAL (Sunday Night Football and simulcasts of games on cable) or WBFF-TV if the Ravens host an NFC team (also Thursday Night Football).

Radio announcers

Radio network
Ravens radio broadcasts air on nineteen stations (two in Spanish) spanning five states and the District of Columbia (updated as of July 25, 2022).

References

Baltimore Ravens
 
Broadcasters
Baltimore Ravens